The Hinkler Hall of Aviation is an air museum in Bundaberg, Queensland, Australia focused on the legacy of Australian aviator Bert Hinkler. The museum opened in 2008 alongside the Hinkler House, and was designed to accommodate up to 34,000 visitors per year. The museum's collection includes five aircraft significant to Hinkler's career: a reconstructed glider from his youth, Hinkler's original Avro Baby, a replica Avro Avian, a replica Hinkler Ibis, and a reconstructed de Havilland Puss Moth. The museum also has on display a small wooden piece of an early Hinkler glider that was carried on board the Space Shuttle Challenger and recovered after its breakup in 1986.

References

External links
 Official website

Aerospace museums in Australia